Charlotte Lewis (born 1967) is an English actress.

Charlotte Lewis may also refer to:
 Charlotte Lewis (basketball) (1955–2007), American basketball player 
 Charlotte Lewis (Lost), character on the television series Lost